Stanley Albert Fafara (September 20, 1950 – September 20, 2003) was an American child actor, best known for his role as Hubert "Whitey" Whitney in the original Leave It to Beaver television series. His older brother, Tiger, played "Tooey W. Brown" in the series.

Early life and career
Fafara was born in San Francisco, California, in September 1950. In 1957, at the age of 7, his mother took him to an open casting call for a new family television series titled Leave It to Beaver. He had been working in commercials and television westerns since the age of 4. Fafara earned the part of Hubert "Whitey" Whitney, one of the Beaver Cleaver's best friends.

Fafara remained with Leave It to Beaver for six years. After the show's cancellation in 1963, he attended North Hollywood High School. He became friendly with the pop-rock band Paul Revere & the Raiders and reportedly moved in with the band for a time. He developed an alcohol habit and began to use drugs.

At his parents' instigation, Fafara went to live with his sister in Jamaica, where he tried his hand at painting; however, he continued to drink and use narcotics. He then returned to Los Angeles in 1972 where he was married briefly. He supported himself by dealing narcotics. In the 1980s he was arrested for breaking into pharmacies seven times. Fafara was sentenced to a year in jail after being arrested and convicted for an eighth burglary. After his release from jail, Fafara tried several jobs but eventually returned to dealing drugs.

Fafara later developed an addiction to heroin and was in-and-out of rehabilitation centers for many years. He became sober in 1995.

Later years and death
Fafara spent the final eight years of his life clean and sober, initially living in a house for recovering addicts and alcoholics, then in a subsidized apartment in downtown Portland, Oregon. He lived on Social Security checks of $475 per month until his hospitalization in 2003. Due to his addiction to heroin, he contracted hepatitis C.

Fafara died on September 20, 2003, his 53rd birthday, in Portland, Oregon, of complications from hernia surgery he underwent the previous month. Fafara is buried at Redland Pioneer Cemetery in Redland, Oregon.

Filmography

References

External links
 
 Whitey Interview at leaveittobeaver.org

1949 births
2003 deaths
20th-century American male actors
American male child actors
American male film actors
American male television actors
American people convicted of burglary
Male actors from San Francisco
Male Western (genre) film actors
People from Studio City, Los Angeles
North Hollywood High School alumni